Nanliang may refer to:

Nanliang, Shanxi, a town in Yicheng County, Shanxi, China

Chinese dynasties
Southern Liang (Sixteen Kingdoms) (397–414; 南涼), one of the Sixteen Kingdoms, in present-day Northwest China
Liang dynasty (502–557), also known as Southern Liang (南梁), one of the southern dynasties during the Northern and Southern Dynasties period, mainly in present-day South China

See also
 Liang dynasty (disambiguation)
 Later Liang (disambiguation)
 Western Liang (disambiguation)